Usual Suspects is the fourth studio album by American hip hop group 5th Ward Boyz. It was released on November 18, 1997, through Rap-A-Lot Records. Recording sessions took place at Hippie House Studios and Digital Services in Houston and at the Enterprise in Burbank. Production was handled by Mike Dean, who had produced the majority of the group's previous three albums, Leroy "Mr. Lee" Williams, Freddie Young, Scarface, Flip, John Bido, and the 5th Ward Boyz themselves. It features guest appearances from Mr. Slimm of 5th Ward Juvenilez, Do or Die, Devin the Dude, Johnny P, Scarface, Spice 1, Willie D, 8Ball & MJG.

Though the album was an improvement on the charts over their last album Rated G, peaking at 180 on the Billboard 200 and 26 on the R&B/Hip-Hop charts, Usual Suspects was less well received. Alex Henderson of AllMusic called it an "unoriginal effort" and said "Usual Suspects demonstrated that in 1997 there were still many rappers who were content to offer one tired, worn-out gangsta rap cliché after another".

Track listing

Charts

Personnel
Andre "007" Barnes – main performer
Eric "E-Rock" Taylor – main performer
Richard "Lo Life" Nash – main performer
Frank Robinson – featured performer (tracks: 2, 3)
Robert L. Green, Jr. – featured performer (track 2)
Red Dog – featured performer (track 3)
Tasha – featured performer (track 4)
Brad Jordan – featured performer & producer (track 6)
Marlon Jermaine Goodwin – featured performer (track 10)
Premro Smith – featured performer (track 10)
John Pigram – featured performer (track 12)
Anthony "N.A.R.D." Round – featured performer (track 12)
Dennis "A.K. 47" Round – featured performer (track 12)
J. "Gotti" Baker – featured performer (track 13)
Devin C. Copeland – featured performer (track 14)
William James Dennis – featured performer (track 14)
Leroy Williams, Jr. – producer (tracks: 2, 6, 11, 12, 14, 15), mixing
Michael George Dean – producer (tracks: 4, 5, 10, 11, 13, 16), mixing, mastering, engineering
Freddie Young – producer (track 3)
Philip "Flip" Osman – producer (track 7), engineering
John Okuribido – producer (track 8)
Joe Bythewood – co-producer (track 12)
James Hoover – engineering & mixing
Dewey Forker – executive producer
James A. Smith – executive producer
Jason Clark – art direction, design
Mario Castellanos – photography

References

External links

1997 albums
5th Ward Boyz albums
Rap-A-Lot Records albums
Albums produced by Mike Dean (record producer)